Los Altos de Jalisco, or the Jaliscan Highlands, is a geographic and cultural region in the eastern part of the Mexican state of Jalisco, famed as a bastion of Mexican culture, cradling traditions from Tequila production to Charrería equestrianism. Los Altos are part of the greater Bajío (The Lowlands) region of Mexico.

Los Altos is primarily a rural or semi-rural region, known for its towns of historic Mexican colonial architecture, deep Catholic conservatism and numerous Mexican traditions such as equestrianism, mariachi music, tequila production, and traditional Mexican dances and festivals. A significant portion of the population consists of Mexicans of European descent, primarily descended from the criollos of Castillian, Extremaduran, Galician, Basque, and Andalusian origin, but also from early Portuguese settlers and later French, Irish, and Italian, German, Dutch, Slavic and Greek immigrants, among others.

History

The region's native inhabitants, the Chichimeca people, were conquered in the 16th century by Spanish conquistadors led by Captains Hernando Martel and Pedro de Anda in the Chichimeca War.

The first peoples that inhabited the region were the Chichimeca nations, a name given by the Mexicas to a group of indigenous peoples who lived in the center and north of the country.

The casualties that the Spanish conquerors incurred in the region due to the Chichimeca attacks led them to answer with a warlike  genocidal tactic. They took to the Altos de Jalisco, rural Castilian militiamen, who have the great majority of French descent who arrived in Castile, Spain during early of Middle Ages to repopulate the center of Spain. However, there were also Portuguese, Basques, Italians and Flemishs (natives of Flanders), who had previously fought against Turks and Moors during the Reconquista. In this way, among Europeans and Indians, the crucible of races so uncharacteristic of this region was formed.

There is also some evidence of Sephardic Jewish settlement in the region during colonial times.

After the French intervention in Mexico within the early 1860s, the French forces were expelled from México under the order of General Eulogio Parra in 1866. However, some French communities stayed in the obscured areas of Los Altos and its surroundings, increasing the proportion of European-looking people in the states of Jalisco, Guanajuato and Aguascalientes.

Los Altos was one of the main scenarios of the Cristero War during the early 20th century, which confronted Catholic peasants and elites against the anti-clerical government of President Plutarco Calles.

Culture

Tequila
Los Altos is  one of the two main tequila producing regions in the state of Jalisco, the other being the municipality of Tequila, Jalisco. The main tequila producing center in the region is Arandas and the second region is Atotonilco El Alto.

Charro
Jalisco's charro tradition is particularly strong in the Los Altos region. In Spain, a charro is a native of the province of Salamanca, especially in the area of Alba de Tormes, Vitigudino, Ciudad Rodrigo and Ledesma. It's likely that the Mexican charro tradition derived from Spanish horsemen who came from Salamanca and settled in Los Altos de Jalisco.

Architecture of Los Altos
Many of Los Altos's older architectural structures, including entire sections of Pre-Hispanic and colonial, have been designated World Heritage sites and Pueblo Mágico for their historical, cultural, artistic significance. Lagos de Moreno is only one city in Los Altos de Jalisco on the lists of Pueblo Magico out of 121. The architecture in Los Altos are heavy influenced by European architects during the Spanish Colonial to early WWI era.

Pilgrimage
Los Altos have many shrines. San Juan de los Lagos is the second most visited pilgrimage shrine in Mexico, after the Basilica of Our Lady of Guadalupe in Mexico City . The numerous shrines are important tourist attractions for the state of Jalisco:
Our Lady of San Juan de los Lagos, in San Juan de los Lagos.
Our Lady of the Assumption, in Jalostotitlán.
Martyred Saint Toribio Romo González, in Santa Ana de Guadalupe, municipal of Jalostotitlán.
Martyred Blessed Anacleto González Flores in Tepatitlan de Morelos. 
Martyred Blessed Miguel Gomez Loza in San Francisco de Asis, municipal of Atotonilco el Alto. 
Martyred Saint Julio Alvarez Mendoz in San Julian, Jalisco. 
Martyred Saint Atilano Cruz-Alvarado in Teocaltiche.
Venerable Mother Maria Luisa Josefa of the Most Blessed Sacrament in Atotonilco El Alto. 
Martyred Saint Pedro Esqueda Ramírez in Teocaltitán, municipal of Jalostotitlán. 
Martyred Saint Sabas Reyes Salazar in Tototlan.
Holy Child of the Little Peanut (Santo Niño del Cacahuatito) in Mezquitic de la Magdalena in municipal of San Juan de los Lagos.
Zapotlanejo
 Nuestra señora la virgen del Rosario.

Administration

Since 1996, Los Altos has been organized administratively by the state of Jalisco into two regions, the North Highlands (Altos Norte) and the South Highlands (Altos Sur).

North Highlands 
The North Highlands (Altos Norte) region covers 8,882 km², which represents 11% of the state's territory. The municipalities in the region are the following:

Lagos de Moreno is the municipality seat of the North Highlands. In this region, factories develop clothing, furniture, footwear, metal goods, sweets and jams. Some of the municipalities in this region have a very important livestock activity mainly in the production of dairy products.

South Highlands 
The South Highlands (Altos Sur) region has 6,667 km², which is 5% of the state's surface. The municipalities of this region are the following:
{{Columns-list|colwidth=15em|style=width: 600px;|
Acatic
Arandas
Cañadas de Obregón
Jalostotitlán
Jesús María
Mexticacán
San Julián
San Miguel el Alto
Tepatitlán de Morelos
Valle de Guadalupe
Yahualica de González Gallo
San Ignacio Cerro Gordo
Capilla de Guadalupe
Zapotlanejo, Puerta de Los Altos
Tepatitlán de Morelos is the municipality seat of the South Highlands. In this region is the most recent municipality of the State, San Ignacio Cerro Gordo, which was separated from Arandas. Traditionally Atotonilco el Alto, Ayotlán, Tototlán and Degollado belong to this southern zone of Los Altos. In general, the region has the production of tequila and the development of livestock, clothing, and various crafts.

Notable Alteños

Politics
Luis Alfonso de Alba Góngora, Mexican under-secretary for Latin America in the Secretary of Foreign Relations, former Mexican Representative to the United Nations (Lagos de Moreno)
Ramón Muñoz Gutiérrez, Senator of Jalisco in the Mexican Senate of the Republic (Lagos de Moreno)
Emilio González Márquez, former Governor of Jalisco (Lagos de Moreno)
Pedro Moreno, general and father of the Mexican War of Independence (Lagos de Moreno)
Francisco Primo de Verdad y Ramos, 18th-century lawyer and politician of colonial New Spain (Ojuelos de Jalisco)
Victoriano Ramírez, Mexican general of the Cristero War (San Miguel el Alto).
José González Gallo, Mexican lawyer and politician who served as Governor of Jalisco (Yahualica de González Gallo).
Rita Pérez de Moreno, Mexican insurgent and heroine of the Mexican War of Independence (San Juan de los Lagos).

Culture
Lola Álvarez Bravo, famed photographer, prominent figure of the post-Mexican Revolution artistic renaissance
Juan Pablo Villalobos, author and entrepreneur
José Rosas Moreno, 19th-century writer, fableist, and poet
Mariano Azuela González, 19th/20th-century literary critic, novelist, and essayist
Jorge González Camarena, Mexican painter, muralist and sculptor, his parents were originally from Arandas.
Guillermo González Camarena, Mexican electrical engineer who was the inventor of a color-wheel type of color television, brother of Jorge.
Juan Sandoval Íñiguez, Mexican cardinal of the Roman Catholic Church, and served as Archbishop of Guadalajara.
Alan Estrada, Mexican actor, dancer and singer.

Athletics
Luis Fernando Macías, professional cyclist, silver medalist at the 2009 Pan-American Road and Track Championship
Armando Reynoso Gutiérrez, baseball player for the Mexico national team, Mexican Baseball Hall of Fame member
Isaác Brizuela Muñoz, Mexican-American footballer for C.D. Guadalajara
Carmelo Reyes González, former professional wrestler
J. Paco Gonzalez, Mexican-born American Thoroughbred horse racing trainer.
Antonio Martínez, Mexican-born American professional football player.
Martín Vásquez, Mexican-American former professional football player and current coach.
Miguel Angel Gonzalez, Mexican MLB player (Baltimore Orioles, Chicago White Sox, Texas Rangers)
Martin Barragan, Professional Mexican footballer from Tizapan el Alto who currently plays for Necaxa.

See also
Bajío
Nueva Galicia
La Gran Chichimeca
Camino Real de Tierra Adentro
Cristero War
Chichimeca War

References

Further reading
Jim Tuck, "The Holy War in Los Altos: Regional Analysis of Mexico's Cristero Rebellion." Tucson, Arizona: University of Arizona Press, 1982, 

Geography of Jalisco
Regions of Mexico